Aditi Saigal, also known by her stage name DOT, is an Indian Indie Artiste. She released her first Extended play called Khamotion. her other songs includes Everybody Dances to Techno.

References

Indian singer-songwriters
Year of birth missing (living people)
Living people
Place of birth missing (living people)